CB6 (short for Capital Bra 6) is the sixth studio album by German rapper Capital Bra, released on 12 April 2019 through Bra Music and Urban. The album reached number one in Austria and Germany, and earned a total of 1.4 billion streams in Germany, resulting in a new all-time record.

Background and singles
Capital Bra released his fifth studio album, Allein, through Team Kuku on 2 November 2018. The album reached the top five in German-speaking Europe. The album was announced on 21 December 2018 through the release of the second single "Benzema". It became his eighth single to top the German charts in late December 2018. In January 2019, it was announced that he had signed with Universal Music Germany and had left ersguterjunge. The album was originally scheduled for release on 26 April, but was released digitally and for streaming on 12 April following a leak of the album.

Track listing
Credits adapted from iTunes and Tidal.

Charts

Weekly charts

Year-end charts

Certifications

Release history

References

Capital Bra albums
2019 albums